Caesium stearate is a metal-organic compound, a salt of сaesium and stearic acid with the chemical formula . The compound is classified as a metallic soap, i.e. a metal derivative of a fatty acid.

Synthesis
A reaction of caesium carbonate with stearic acid.

References

Stearates
Caesium compounds